Warwick Airport may refer to:

 Warwick Airport (Queensland) in Warwick, Queensland, Australia (ICAO: YWCK)
 Warwick Municipal Airport in Warwick, New York, United States (FAA: N72)
 T. F. Green Airport in Warwick, Rhode Island, United States (FAA: PVD)